On 8 September 2000, following a three-day Millennium Summit of world leaders gathered in New York at the headquarters of the United Nations, the UN General Assembly
adopted some 60 goals regarding peace; development; environment; human rights; the vulnerable, hungry, and poor; Africa; and the United Nations which is called Millennium Declaration (Resolution 55/2). A follow-up outcome of the resolution was passed by the General Assembly on 14 December 2000 to guide its implementation. Progress on implementation of the Declaration was reviewed at the 2005 World Summit of leaders. The Declaration includes 8 chapters and 32 paragraphs.

Chapters
The Millennium Declaration has eight chapters and key objectives, adopted by 189 world leaders during the summit: The Declaration, after the Vienna Declaration and Programme of Action, stresses the observance of international human rights law and international humanitarian law under the Principles of United Nations Charter as well as the treaties on sustainable development. The Declaration also urges observance of the Olympic truce individually and collectively.
Values and Principles
Freedom
Equality
Solidarity
Tolerance
Respect for nature - "Shown in the management of all living species and natural resources, in accordance with the precepts of sustainable development."
Shared responsibility 
Peace, Security and Disarmament
Development and Poverty Eradication
Protecting our Common Environment
Human Rights, Democracy and Good Governance
Protecting the Vulnerable
Meeting the Special Needs of Africa
Strengthening the United Nations

See also
Commission for Social Development
United Nations
Millennium Summit
2005 World Summit
International Human Solidarity Day
Millennium Development Goals
Vienna Declaration and Programme of Action
Sustainable Development Goals

References

Bibliography

 

United Nations General Assembly resolutions
2000 in the United Nations
Turn of the third millennium